Basil Thomas Wigoder, Baron Wigoder QC (12 February 1921 – 12 August 2004) was a politician and barrister in the United Kingdom.

Early life 
Wigoder, whose father was a dentist, and mother a judge, studied history at Oriel College, Oxford, after attending Manchester Grammar School. During World War II, he served between 1942 and 1945 in the Royal Artillery. On 14 August 1942 he was promoted to second Lieutenant. After the war, he began law studies at Oriel College and he was also president of the Oxford Union, the Debate chamber of the university until 1946. After graduation, he was called to the Bar at Gray's Inn in 1946.

Career

Public prosecutor and lawyer 
After being called to the Bar, he dealt mainly with criminal law and was introduced in 1951 by his lawyer A. P. Marshall in the case Willcock v Muckle, which led to the end of the use of identity cards from the war.

In the following years, he became one of the leading specialist lawyers for Individual rights. As prosecutor, he worked in the case against Anthony Reuter, a leader of the youth protest movement Teddy Boy, who was sentenced in 1956 for malicious injury to five years imprisonment, and against a man in 1961 to 50 pound sterling after kicking a greyhound at a greyhound race at Wembley.

Liberal Party career 
Like many other barristers, Wigoder also engaged in politics and ran in the 1945 United Kingdom general election, and in a by-election on 15 November 1945 for the Liberal Party in the Bournemouth constituency. He was unsuccessful in both elections for a parliamentary mandate in the House of Commons.

Wigoder remained prominent in Liberal politics, standing in Westbury in 1959 and 1964, without success.

In 1963, he succeeded Desmond Banks as Executive Chairman of the Liberal Party and held the position until his replacement by Gruffyd Evans. Subsequently, he was Chairman of the Committee for the Organisation of the Party Lectures of the Liberal Party between 1965 and 1966.

Significant trials as a defence lawyer 
On 20 April 1966 Wigoder was appointed for his legal services to the Crown lawyer (Queen's Counsel), and then dealt with many significant cases before the Old Bailey, the Central Criminal Court.

One of his earliest defences after his appointment as Crown Attorney was a successful case before Gerald Thesiger, a Judge of the Civil Division (Queen's Bench Division) of the UK and Wales High Court of Justice. In the case of a man accused of murdering another guest at a celebration in Notting Hill, he successfully defended the defendant by defending him against a groundless attack.

Afterwards he was a sought after defence lawyer and had over time known clients such as the former Paymaster General George Wigg, who was acquitted in a case of prostitution, or Sheila Buckley, a lover of former Labour Party politician John Stonehouse, who was sued for simulating suicide in 1974. In other proceedings, he defended the painter Francis Bacon for possession of cannabis and Alfred Berman, one of the defendants in the trial of the so-called Richardson Gang in 1966. Unlike most of the co-defendants, Berman was acquitted.

Also in 1966, Wigoder appeared in a mysterious case against the native of Nigeria student Orishagbemi, who was charged with the murder of his tenant. As a defence, it was portrayed that this girl was a witch who had cursed Orishagbemi and his wife; Orishagbemi had only tried to ward off this curse. In the face of this hopeless defence, Wigoder lost the case. In 1967, Wigoder was commissioned by the Ministry of Commerce to investigate the events surrounding the financial services institution Pinnock Finance.

His other clients included the House of Commons journalist and later Conservative Member of Parliament Jonathan Aitken, who was charged in 1971 under the Official Secrets Act for passing classified information about the Biafra war to the weekly The Sunday Telegraph. Wigoder successfully argued in his plea in favour of Aitken that it was his duty "to act in the interests of the state". This plea has since become a basis for similar processes. Over the years he has been a constant critic of the provisions of this law, which he considered illiberal and unfair.

Most recently, Wigoder appeared as a defence lawyer in a series of lawsuits against the Irish Republican Army (IRA), such as a defendant in the Aldershot Garrison bombing trial in 1972, and the so-called Guildford Four, who were alleged IRA terrorists. They were convicted of bombings on a pub in Guildford in 1975. It was only in 1989 that a review procedure was initiated which led to the annulment of the judgements.

Engagements in legal organisations 
In 1970 he became a member of the General Council of the Bar and remained a member until 1974. Furthermore, Wigoder worked between 1971 and 1977 as a member of the Rules Committee at the Crown Court and then from 1972 to 1984 as a writer (Recorder) of the Crown Court. During this time he was with the Attorney Lewis Hawser, who was co-chair of a Judiciary Committee, which proposed the transfer of criminal proceedings from the police to an independent public prosecution authority. In 1972 he founded the Criminal Bar Association with Jeremy Hutchinson.

House of Lords 
On 16 May 1974, by Letters patent, Wigoder was created a Life peer as Baron Wigoder, of Cheetham in the City of Manchester, therefore he had the peerage until his death, and was a member of the House of Lords.

During his senior citizenship, he was the leader of the Liberal Party in the House of Lords, after his appointment by Frank Byers, Baron Byers, first Parliamentary Chief Executive of the Liberal Party (Liberal Chief Whip in the House of Lords) 1977–1984 and later spokesman for his group for domestic and health policy. In his House speeches, he was extremely critical of government proposals regarding both the limitation of jury trial rights and the curtailment of a right to appeal in so-called "lenient sentencing cases".

Other commitments 
Baron Wigoder became chairman of the Health Services Board in 1977 and, after being dissolved by Prime Minister Margaret Thatcher in 1980, became its chairman from 1981 to 1992, and subsequently chairman of the healthcare company Bupa. He also served from 1984 to 1990 as President of the Statute Society.

Personal life 
Wigoder lived in London for most of his adult life after being brought up in Manchester.

He married Yolanda Levinson in 1948 and had four children, including the businessman and business manager Charles Wigoder, who is also executive chairman of the telecommunications company Telecom Plus.

He died on 12 August 2004 after illness.

Arms

External links 

 Entry in Cracroft's Peerage
  in Leigh Rayment Peerage
 Entry in They Work For You 
 Obituary: Lord Wigoder. Liberal peer and lawyer who championed individual rights. In: The Guardian vom 3. September 2004

References

1921 births
2004 deaths
Alumni of Oriel College, Oxford
Chairs of the Liberal Party (UK)
English barristers
Liberal Party (UK) life peers
People educated at Manchester Grammar School
Politicians from Manchester
Presidents of the Oxford Union
Members of Gray's Inn
Royal Artillery officers
British Army personnel of World War II
Liberal Party (UK) parliamentary candidates
20th-century English lawyers
Life peers created by Elizabeth II